Clare County is a county in the U.S. state of Michigan. As of the 2020 Census, the population was 30,856. The county seat is Harrison.

History

The county was created by the Michigan Legislature from part of Michilimackinac County in 1840, named Kaykakee County after a Sauk Indian Chief. It was renamed Clare County in 1843 after County Clare in Ireland. The county was administered by a succession of other Michigan counties prior to the organization of county government in 1871. Farwell was the first county seat; in 1877 the county seat was moved to Harrison.

Geography
It is considered to be part of both Northern Michigan and Central Michigan.

Features
 Au Sable State Forest

Major highways
  runs east–west through bottom of county. Enters west county line at 3.7 miles (6 km) north of SW corner of county. Runs easterly to intersection with US127 at 2.8 miles (4.5 km) north of Clare.
  runs through Clare with Bus. US 127 until they meet M-115, where Bus. US 10 runs eastward to US 10.
  runs north–south through eastern middle of county, Passing Harrison and Clare.
  runs through Clare with Bus. US 10 until the two meet M-115, where Bus. US 10 turns eastward while Bus. US 127 continues southward to US 127.
  runs from US 127 to go through Harrison. Bus. US 127 intersects M-61, and the two have a concurrency with each other until they both intersect US 127, where Bus. US 127 ends with M-61 continues eastward to Gladwin.
  runs east–west through middle of county, entering the west line from Osceola County and running east to intersection with US 127 at Harrison.
  runs southeast and east across bottom of county. US 127/Bus. US 10 at Clare.

Adjacent counties

 Missaukee County – northwest
 Roscommon County – northeast
 Gladwin County – east
 Midland County – southeast
 Isabella County – south
 Mecosta County – southwest
 Osceola County – west

Demographics

The 2010 United States Census indicates Clare County had a 2010 population of 30,926. This decrease of 326 people from the 2000 United States Census represents a loss of 1.0% population. In 2010 there were 12,966 households and 8,584 families in the county. The population density was 54.8 per square mile (21.2 per km2). There were 23,233 housing units at an average density of 41.2 per square mile (15.9 per km2). The racial and ethnic makeup of the county was 95.8% White, 0.5% Black or African American, 0.6% Native American, 0.3% Asian, 1.5% Hispanic or Latino, 0.1% from other races, and 1.3% from two or more races.

There were 12,966 households, out of which 25.3% had children under the age of 18 living with them, 51.0% were husband and wife families, 10.0% had a female householder with no husband present, 33.8% were non-families, and 28.0% were made up of individuals. The average household size was 2.36 and the average family size was 2.83.

The county population contained 20.9% under age of 18, 7.9% from 18 to 24, 20.8% from 25 to 44, 30.4% from 45 to 64, and 19.9% who were 65 years of age or older. The median age was 45 years. For every 100 females there were 99.7 males. For every 100 females age 18 and over, there were 97.9 males.

The 2010 American Community Survey 3-year estimate indicates the median income for a household in the county was $33,338 and the median income for a family was $40,983. Males had a median income of $24,220 versus $13,587 for females. The per capita income for the county was $18,516. About 2.3% of families and 23.1% of the population were below the poverty line, including 36.8% of those under the age 18 and 8.5% of those age 65 or over.

Religion
 The Roman Catholic Diocese of Saginaw is the controlling regional body for the Catholic Church.
 The Church of Jesus Christ of Latter-day Saints has one meetinghouse in the county, in Harrison.

Government
Clare County voters tend to vote Republican; they have selected the Republican Party nominee in 71% of national elections (24 of 34).

The county government operates the jail, maintains rural roads, operates the major local courts, records deeds, mortgages, and vital records, administers public health regulations, and participates with the state in the provision of social services. The county board of commissioners controls the budget and has limited authority to make laws or ordinances. In Michigan, most local government functions — police and fire, building and zoning, tax assessment, street maintenance, etc. — are the responsibility of individual cities and townships.

Elected officials

 County Commission: Dale Majewski; Samantha Pitchford; Leonard Strouse; Jack Kleinhardt; Mark Fitzpatrick; David Hoefling; Jeff Haskell
 Prosecuting Attorney: Michelle Ambrozaitis
 Sheriff: John Wilson
 County Clerk/Register of Deeds: Lori Martin
 County Treasurer: Jenny Beemer-Fritzinger
 Drain Commissioner: Carl Parks
 County Surveyor: Paul A. Lapham
 Road Commission: Dave Coker; Tim Haskin; Karen Hulliberger; Bill Simpson; Max Schunk
 State Representative: Speaker of the House Jason Wentworth

(information as of January 2019)

Attractions
Clare County is in the middle of large state forests. Wildlife, including bear, deer, eagles, Kirtland's warblers, and turkeys, are located nearby. Local attractions include:
 Kirtland's Warbler Habitat and Festival
 Michigan Shore-to-Shore Trail passes through the area, running from Empire to Oscoda and points beyond. It is a 500-mile interconnected system of trails.

Activities include:
 Birding
 Boating
 Fishing
 Hiking
 Hunting
 Nordic skiing
 ORV and groomed snowmobile trails.
 Paddling (canoe and kayak)

Communities

Cities 
 Clare (partial)
 Harrison (county seat)

Village
 Farwell

Civil townships

 Arthur Township
 Franklin Township
 Freeman Township
 Frost Township
 Garfield Township
 Grant Township
 Greenwood Township
 Hamilton Township
 Hatton Township
 Hayes Township
 Lincoln Township
 Redding Township
 Sheridan Township
 Summerfield Township
 Surrey Township
 Winterfield Township

Unincorporated communities

 Airport Forest
 Allendale
 Ash Acres
 Buck Trails
 Colonville
 Cooperton
 Dover
 Hatton
 Lake
 Lake George
 Leota
 Long Lake Heights
 Meredith (partial)
 Phelps
 Piney Woods
 Rainbow Bend
 Temple

Ghost town
 Clarence

See also
 List of Michigan State Historic Sites in Clare County, Michigan
 National Register of Historic Places listings in Clare County, Michigan

Notes

References

External links
Official Visitor Information Site
 Clare County Convention & Visitors Bureau
 The Clare County Chamber of Commerce
 The Clare County Business Association Website
News from Clare County

 The Clare County Cleaver-Local newspaper

 The Clare County Review - Local newspaper
 Clare County government
 Clare Sentinel Newspaper Online via Clarke Historical Library and Central Michigan University

 
Michigan counties
1871 establishments in Michigan